Tunap/Hunstein Rural LLG (often spelled locally as Tunap/Hustein) is a local-level government (LLG) of East Sepik Province, Papua New Guinea. The LLG is home to speakers of many different Left May languages and Sepik languages.

Wards
01. Hotmin
02. Burmai
03. Arai
04. Nino (Nimo language speakers)
05. Itelinu
06. Samo (Owiniga language speakers)
07. Painum
08. Wanium
09. Aumi
10. Pekwei
11. Wanamoi
12. Waniap (Ama language (New Guinea) speakers)
13. Kavia (Ama language (New Guinea) speakers)
14. Ama (Ama language (New Guinea) speakers)
15. Yenuai (Nakwi language and Ama language (New Guinea) speakers)
16. Panawai
17. Imombi (Iwam language speakers)
18. Mowi (Iwam language speakers)
19. Iniok (Sepik Iwam language speakers)
20. Paupe (Papi language speakers)
21. Oum 3
22. Walio (Walio language speakers)
23. Nein
24. Nekiei/Wusol
25. Masuwari
26. Sio (Sanio language speakers)
27. Hanasi (Sanio language speakers)
28. Moropote
29. Maposi (Sanio language speakers)
30. Lariaso
31. Yabatawe
32. Sowano
33. Bitara (Berinomo language speakers)
34. Kagiru (Berinomo language speakers)
35. Begapuki
36. Wagu
37. Niksek/Paka (Niksek language speakers)
38. Gahom (Bahinemo language speakers)

References

Local-level governments of East Sepik Province